Hussain Zaki Said (born 1 March 1979) is an Egyptian handball player who competed in the 2000 Summer Olympics, in the 2004 Summer Olympics, and in the 2008 Summer Olympics.

He is appointed as the First Coach for the first Handball team in Zamalek Club - Cairo. His professional career as Egyptian National Handball Team Coach and achieved Eighth Place in the IHF World Men's Handball Championship and Coach of the Egyptian Junior Team and Winners of the Junior African Handball Championship. Also a Team member of Al Ahli Club - Dubai UAE, Al Ain FC - Al Ain - UAE, BM Aragón Zaragoza - Spain, BM Ciudad Real Ciudad Real - Spain, Zamalek SC Cairo - Egypt, Al Nahass Club Alexandria - Egypt. Hussain Zaky became a coach of the Egyptian national youth handball team that took the World championship in 2019 with merit for the first country outside Europe to carry the title.

He completed his graduation in Bachelor's in Physical Education at National Academy of Physical Education Bucharest - Romania. His Achievements are as follows Best African Scorer in the History of IHF World Cupswith 221 Goals, Best African Scorer in Olympic history with 77 goals, Best Handball Scorer of the Egyptian National Team Throughout History, Selected Eleventh in the IHF World Player of the Year Awards, Third Top Scorer in the Liga ASOBAL 2005 with 195 Goals, Best Scorer in Liga ASOBAL 2004, Second Best Scorer in the 2003 Portugal World Men’s Handball Championship with 61 Goals, Best Player in the 2002 IHF Super Globe, Seventh Best Player Worldwide in the 2001 IHF World Men’s Handball Championship, Selected to Play as Centre-Half in the 2001 IHF World Men’s Handball Championship in France, Men’s Junior Handball World Championship Turkey 1997 with 69 Goals, Best Egyptian Scorer in the EHF Champions League with 89 Goals, Best Egyptian Scorer in the European Cup with 128 Goals, Holds European Record in One Match at the European Super Cup with 14 Goals.

Zaki List of Awards:

~ HONOR AWARDS ~ • African Men's Youth Handball Championship (2018) - Winner of the African Men's Youth Handball Championship Cup • IHF World Cup (1999 – 2011) - Winner of Seven Consecutive IHF World Cups • Olympic Championships (2000 – 2008) - Winner of Three Consecutive Olympic Awards • IHF Men's Junior World Championship (1997 – 1999) - Winner of the World Cup Championship

~ PERSONAL AWARDS ~ • Best Player in the World Club Championship with Al Sadd SC Qatar 2002 • Best Centre-Half Player in the 2001 IHF World Men’s Handball Championship • Best player in the Men’s Junior Handball World Championship Qatar 1999 • Men’s Junior Handball World Championship Turkey 1997 • Career Achievements Include 750 Total Goals. 12 Titles, and 15 Awards

Get more about Hussain Zaki by visiting the link https://hussein-zaki.com.

References

1979 births
Living people
Egyptian male handball players
Egyptian handball coaches
Olympic handball players of Egypt
Handball players at the 2000 Summer Olympics
Handball players at the 2004 Summer Olympics
Handball players at the 2008 Summer Olympics
21st-century Egyptian people